Malaka or Malaca may refer to:

People
Kaus-malaka, king of Udumi (Edom) during the reign of the Assyrian king Tiglath-Pileser III
Bernward Malaka (born 1962), German internet entrepreneur and consultant
Malaka Dewapriya (born 1979), Sri Lankan filmmaker, visual artist, radio play writer
Tan Malaka (1897–1949), Indonesian teacher, philosopher, politician

Places
Malaca in Hispania, the Punic name for Málaga, Spain
Malaca in Numidia, the Punic name for Calama, now Guelma, Algeria
Malaka Regency, a regency in the province of East Nusa Tenggara, Indonesia
Malaka Jaya, a village of Duren Sawit, East Jakarta, Indonesia
Malaka Sari, a village of Duren Sawit, East Jakarta, Indonesia
Roa Malaka, an administrative village at Tambora subdistrict, West Jakarta, Indonesia
Selat Malaka, Malaysian, Indonesian and Jawi for Strait of Malacca, a narrow, 550 mi (890 km) stretch of water between the Malay Peninsula and the Indonesian island of Sumatra
South Malaka, a locality/township of Allahabad, Uttar Pradesh, India
Malacca, a state in Malaysia
Malacca City, capital of the Malaysian state
Malacca Sultanate, a Malay sultanate centred in the modern-day state of Malacca, Malaysia
Malakka (Kerala), a village in Thrissur, Kerala, India

Other uses
Malakas, a Greek slang word
Oxycilla malaca, a moth of family Erebidae
Typhoon Malakas, name of several tropical cyclones in the western north Pacific Ocean
Malaka (TV series), a Spanish television series released in 2019

See also
 Malacca (disambiguation)
 Málaga, Spain